Troy Cordingley (born January 9, 1967) is an indoor lacrosse coach and former player. He is currently the head coach of the Vancouver Warriors in the National Lacrosse League (NLL). He is one of five NLL coaches with at least 100 career wins.

Playing career 
Cordingley played in the NLL from 1993 to 2001, spending his first seven years with the Buffalo Bandits, followed by two seasons with the Albany Attack and one with the Rochester Knighthawks. In nine NLL seasons, he scored 128 goals and 312 points in 87 regular season games and 15 goals and 33 points in 9 playoff games. As a player, he won the NLL Championship in 1993 and 1996 with the Bandits.

Cordingley also played Canadian box lacrosse for the Brampton Excelsiors and Coquitam Adanacs, winning four Mann Cups.

Coaching career 
Cordingley served as the head coach of the Calgary Roughnecks in 2008 and 2009, finishing with a 19-13 record. From 2010 to 2013, he was the head coach of the Toronto Rock from 2010 to 2013, advancing to the Champion's Cup finals in 2010, and winning the Cup in 2011 During his time in Toronto, Cordingley garnered a 38-26 record. On July 3, 2013 he was hired as head coach of the Buffalo Bandits, replacing the fired Darris Kilgour. He was relieved of his head coaching duties with the Bandits on September 20, 2018 and was reassigned to the Bandits' scouting department. On June 28, 2022, he was hired as the head coach of the Vancouver Warriors.

Cordingley has won the Les Bartley Award twice, the first time in 2009 with the Roughnecks and again in 2013 with the Rock.

External links 

 Playing stats on StatsCrew.com
 Coaching stats on StatsCrew.com

References

1967 births
Living people
Albany Attack players
Buffalo Bandits players
Buffalo Bandits coaches
Calgary Roughnecks coaches
Canadian lacrosse players
Rochester Knighthawks players
Toronto Rock coaches
Vancouver Warriors coaches